Sarindoides is a monotypic genus of Brazilian jumping spiders containing the single species, Sarindoides violaceus. It was first described by Cândido Firmino de Mello-Leitão in 1922, and is found only in Brazil.

References

Monotypic Salticidae genera
Salticidae
Spiders of Brazil
Taxa named by Cândido Firmino de Mello-Leitão